Two ships of the Royal Australian Navy have been named HMAS Moresby, for Captain (later Admiral) John Moresby:

, a 24-class sloop serving with the Royal Navy from 1918 to 1925 as HMS Silvio, and with the RAN from 1925 to 1946
, a unique survey vessel serving from 1963 until 1998, before entering civilian service

Battle honours
Ships named HMAS Moresby are entitled to carry two battle honours:
Pacific 1942–43
New Guinea 1943–44

See also
, a Royal Navy destroyer serving in World War I
, a Canadian Forces minesweeper operating from 1989 to 2000

References

Royal Australian Navy ship names